The San Juan Islander (originally the Islander) was a weekly newspaper published every Thursday that covered the San Juan Islands community in Friday Harbor, Washington. Because the San Juan Island community consisted of mostly farmers and fishermen, the newspaper focused on commodity prices, agricultural production, and movements of nearby shipping vessels. Under the name The Islander, the paper was published by James Cooper Wheeler from 1891 to 1899 before being bought by Fred and Otis Culver, who changed its name. The paper was eventually sold to John N. Dickie in 1913 and finally ceased production in 1914. The paper continued to be produced under the name the San Juan Islander from Feb. 24, 1898 to 1914.

The website of the same name has been online since about 1999, and does not appear to have any connection to the original newspaper.

References 

Defunct weekly newspapers
Newspapers published in Washington (state)
1891 establishments in Washington (state)
San Juan Islands
1914 disestablishments in the United States